"Morning Deliveries (Milkman #1)" is a short story by Stephen King published in King's 1985 collection Skeleton Crew. The story follows the morning route of a milkman named Spike Milligan, who leaves various "surprises" in the milk bottles for his customers to find, including poisonous liquids, deadly gas, and venomous spiders.

This story was adapted from an unfinished novel called "The Milkman."

See also
 Stephen King short fiction bibliography

References
 Winter, Douglas E. Stephen King: The Art of Darkness. Signet, 1986.

External links
 Livraisons matinales / Morning Deliveries—an animation inspired by this story.

Morning Deliveries (Milkman #1)
1985 short stories
Horror short stories
Milligan, Spike